John Bellasis may refer to:

 John Bellasis, 1st Baron Bellasis or John Belasyse, 1st Baron Belasyse (1614–1689), English nobleman, soldier and politician
 John Bellasis (East India Company officer) (died 1808), British major-general who was commanding the forces at Bombay
 John Bellasis, a fictional character in the Belgravia TV series